Tan Sitong (March 10, 1865 – September 28, 1898), courtesy name Fusheng, pseudonym Zhuangfei, was a well-known Chinese politician, thinker, and reformist in the late Qing dynasty (1644–1911). He was executed at the age of 33 when the Hundred Days' Reform failed in 1898. Tan Sitong was one of the six gentlemen of the Hundred Days' Reform, and occupies an important place in modern Chinese history. To many contemporaries, his execution symbolized the political failure of the Qing dynasty's reformation, helping to persuade the intellectual class to pursue violent revolution and overthrow the Qing dynasty.

Early life

Tan Sitong was one of nine siblings and was born in Beijing, although his family originally came from Liuyang, Hunan Province. His father, Tan Jixun, was the governor of Hubei, and his mother, a traditional Chinese housewife named Xu Wuyuan, was very strict with her children.

Tan spent his childhood in Beijing and his youth in Liuyang. He began his formal education at 5 and was tutored by a famous scholar called Ouyang Zhonggu when he was 10. Although he was talented at essay writing, he objected to the conventional form of the essay that was required for examinations. As a result, he only achieved the title of "student member" (shengyuan; 生員), a very low educational level.

At the age of 12, Tan's mother, eldest brother, and second eldest sister died within a span of five days due to diphtheria that had spread during a visit to a cousin. He also fell gravely ill but recovered three days later, which many people deemed to be a miracle. After Tan lost his mother, his father's concubine treated him badly.

In 1879, Tan studied under another scholar, Xu Qixian, with whom he began a systematic study of representative works in Chinese, as well as natural science.

In 1884, he left his home and traveled to several different provinces of China, including Hebei, Gansu, Xinjiang, Shaanxi, Henan, Hubei, Jiangxi, Jiangsu, Anhui, Zhejiang, Shandong, and Shanxi. He composed more than 200 poems during the trip.

At the age of 19, Tan married a woman named Li Run and had a son named Tan Lansheng, who died within a year of being born.

Reforming campaign

Background
National isolationism began in the early 19th century, corruption had grown beyond control, inherited from the previous Ming dynasty. The technological gap between China and western states had widen a lot, no longer was China the more technologically advanced polity. The widening technological gap was because imperialist and colonialist western states had exploited weaker states' resources for themselves while depriving these weaker states the resources. The disproportionate amount of resources that westerners can use to develop technologically is why between 1500 and the 20th century were they able to conquer the world.

The First Opium War between China and Britain resulted because British merchants wanted to sell opium in China instead of using silver to pay for goods they wish to buy in China, which ushered in a period of foreign invasion and colonization in China, at the time ruled by the Qing dynasty. During this time, Chinese intellectuals and officials sought ways to improve Chinese life and national prospects.

In 1895, after a defeat by Japan in the First Sino-Japanese War, China was forced to sign the unequal Treaty of Shimonoseki, under which Taiwan was occupied and 250 million taels were paid to Japan. Astonished and indignant by the defeat, Tan realized the necessity of a thorough reformation in China, and he and his colleagues searched for new approaches to improve national standing. In 1896, he wrote the poem My Feelings:

世间无物抵春愁，合向苍冥一哭休。四万万人齐下泪，天涯何处是神州？Nothing in this world can withstand the longing for spring, These longings join together until they reach the shadowy netherworld in tears. The wailing 400 million people are asking the same question:Oh where, oh where on this earth can we find our divine China?

Between 1896 and 1897, he finished writing a book called Ren Xue (仁学, Theory of Benevolence), which was considered to be the first philosophical work of the Reform. In the book, he said absolute monarchy greatly oppressed human nature. In 1898, he founded a new academy called the South Academy, which attempted to introduce Reformation ideals in southern China, specifically the Hunan district. He later created the newspaper Hunan Report to publicize the advantage of reform policies.

Hundred Days Reform

Early in 1898, Tan was introduced to Emperor Guangxu, who was considering enacting reform policies. He was appointed a member of the Grand Council, and within two months the Hundred Days' Reform began with the issuing of an Imperial order titled Ming Ding Guo Shi. However, some of the new policies appeared to challenge the existing interests of many government officials, which led to objections from Manchu aristocrats and they reported the case to Empress Dowager Cixi,  who was the de facto leader of the central authority as she was holding much more political leverage than the Emperor, even though he had been literally in power for more than two decades. As a result, the Reform policies did not gain wide and effective support officially.

In September 1898, Tan and his counterparts thought the Dowager and conservative officials were planning to interfere with the Reformation campaign, and he visited general Yuan Shikai（袁世凯）, in the hope that Yuan's army could support the Reformation Movement by murdering Ronglu (荣禄，a Manchu official who was in charge of the capital and its surrounding regions then) and imprisoning Cixi in the Summer Palace. After returning to Tianjin,  he immediately betrayed the Reform movement by divulging the conspiracy. Cixi was also informed that the reformists were trying to engage Itō Hirobumi (a Japanese politician and reformist who was touring in China) as a government consultant and provide him with a certain amount of power, which worried her significantly about the dynasty's stability.

As a result, Cixi returned to the Forbidden City from the Summer Palace on Sep 21 and led a coup, where she seized the throne power from Emperor Guangxu and ordered the arrest of all those involved in the Reformation. The short-lived Reformation Movement ended 103 days after it began and it has been known ever since as the Hundred Days' Reform. Emperor Guangxu was imprisoned at Ying Tai (a tiny island in the middle of a lake) in Zhongnanhai, allowing Cixi to absolutely consolidate her public standing and authority. All the Reformation policies were abolished except for Jing Shi Da Xue Tang (京师大学堂), the first government-established tertiary educational institution in China's history, which later on became Peking University.

Tan was arrested at the Guild Hall of Liuyang in Beijing on September 24. He had been encouraged to escape to Japan, where the government had expressed sympathy for Reformist scholars. However, Tan refused to go with the reason that his sacrifice would serve as a catalyst for Reformation ideals among the nation. His words on this were as follows:

各国变法，无不从流血而成。今中国未闻有因变法而流血者，此国之所以不昌者也。有之，请从嗣同始。Seen from the world, no successful reforms were made without bleeding. So far, within China, it has never been heard that anyone sacrificed his life to reform the nation, for which the country lacks prosperity. If there is anyone to be, just start from me.

After being captured, Tan was put in the Xing Bu Da Lao (刑部大牢), the jail belonging to the then-Ministry of Justice, and charged with treason and attempting a military coup. The legal inquiry process was interrupted by an abrupt order from the Emperor (effectively made by Cixi) calling for an immediate execution due to the severity of his crimes. Consequently, Tan was escorted to the Caishikou Execution Grounds outside Xuanwu Gate of Peking on the afternoon of September 28, 1898, where he was executed by beheading along with five others: Yang Shenxiu, Lin Xu, Liu Guangdi, Kang Guangren (younger brother of Kang Youwei), and Yang Rui. Historically, these men are called the six gentlemen of the Hundred Days' Reform. There were originally another two officials to be executed along with the six, Zhang Yinhuan and Xu Zhijing, but they survived the execution due to rescues by high-ranked officials and foreign interventions.

Tan's last words on the execution ground are well known in China, translated as follows:
有心杀贼，无力回天。死得其所，快哉! 快哉! Having got the intention to kill the robbers, I lacked the strength to transform my destiny. Sacrificing at the place where I should die, it is exciting! exciting!

Death and legacy
After the execution, Tan's remains were collected and stored by some of his friends. In 1899, the remains were sent to and buried in his hometown, Liuyang, Hunan. His father, despite his disagreement with his son's reform efforts, was stripped of all official duties, and returned to his hometown, where he died three years later. Tan's wife, Li Run (李闰), became active in promoting girls’ education and also volunteered as a foster mother in Hunan in her later years. She died in 1925, 14 years after the collapse of the Qing dynasty and 27 years after her husband's death.

See also
Former Residence of Tan Sitong
Lin Xu
Tang Caichang

References

External links 

1865 births
1898 deaths
People from Wuwei
Philosophers from Gansu
19th-century Chinese philosophers
Qing dynasty politicians from Gansu
Executed Qing dynasty people
Executed people from Gansu
People executed by the Qing dynasty by decapitation
19th-century executions by China